Viktor Mikhailovich Kuznetsov (born 14 December 1941) is a Greco-Roman wrestling coach from Russia. His trainees include Aleksandr Karelin, Roman Vlasov and Vladimir Zubkov.

Kuznetsov took up wrestling in 1957, and retired in 1962 to become a coach in his club Dynamo Novosibirsk. He later worked at different sports organizations in Novosibirsk, and since 1994 heads the wrestling school associated with the Karelin's Fund. Kuznetsov graduated from the institutes of physical education in Novosibirsk and Omsk; he is married and has a son Vadim. For his achievements he was awarded the Order of the Badge of Honour and Order of Friendship of Peoples.

References

1941 births
Living people
Russian male sport wrestlers
Russian wrestling coaches
Sportspeople from Novosibirsk